Anoushiravan Rohani (born July 24, 1939), also spelled Anooshiravan Rowhani, is an Iranian pianist and composer. He is known for composing and conducting contemporary classical music, as well as pop music with light classical leaning. He has also composed a number of scores to Iranian films.

Early life
Born in Rasht, in the Gilan Province of Iran in 1939, Rohani received music lessons from his father, himself a poet and violinist. His brothers, Shahrdad Rohani, Ardeshir Rohani and Shahriar Rohani are also musicians. When Rohani was nine years old he had his first song broadcast on Iranian National Radio network.

Rohani later studied piano with pianist Javad Maroufi at the Persian National Music Conservatory in Tehran.

Besides piano, Rohani mastered the electronic organ and accordion. In 1958, Anoushirvan officially began his long collaboration with the National Iranian Radio. Rohani's career includes over 500 compositions that feature vocals, orchestral arrangements, piano pieces and film scores, among them "Soltan-e-Ghalbhaa", "Dele Kuchuloo," and "Gol-e-Sang."

Later works
After the Iranian Revolution of 1979, Rohani continued his composing in the Western world, principally based in Los Angeles and Germany, where he recorded albums under the MZM record label.

Rohani worked with orchestras outside of Iran, including the Czech Symphony Orchestra in Prague, which performed the orchestral pieces from his album 'Symphonic Love Melodies.

In 2003, he wrote one song for Scorpions, Maybe I Maybe You, which features on the album Unbreakable.

Discography

Studio albums
The albums listed below are from his post-revolutionary compositions:

  King of Hearts, 1968
  Faryaad, 1970, Catapult
  Tavalodet Mobarak (Happy Birthday), 1972, Catapult
  Soltan e Ghalbha (Emperor of Hearts), featuring Shahdad Rohani, 1982, Catapult
  Taraneh-e Saal, with Hayedeh and Moein, 1985, Catapult
  Yadgar-e Omr 1 (The Reminiscence of Life , Vol 1), 1992, Catapult
  Yadgar-e Omr 2 (The Reminiscence of Life , Vol 2), 1993, Catapult
  Bahaneh, with Leila Forouhar, 1993, Catapult
  Zolfaye Yaaram, with Sima Bina, 1993
  Oaj-e Seda, with Hayedeh and Mahasti, 1994, Catapult
  Mohebat, 1994, Catapult
  Rangaarang, 1972, Catapult
  Love Melodies (Symphonic), with the Czech Symphony Orchestra of Prague, 1997, Catapult

Compilation albums 
   Scent of Yesterday, Vol 13, 2009
   Persian Odes (Chakameh-Haye Irani) Persian Old Songs, 2011
   Oud? CDs , 2011

Legacy
Rohani composed the Persian equivalent of "Happy Birthday" entitled "Tavalodet Mobarak" (lit. "blessed be your birthday"). It is commonly sung at Persian birthday parties (dedicated to his nephew Shervin Shaffiy).

See also
 List of birthday songs
 List of Iranian musicians
 Music of Iran
 Persian pop music

References

External links 

 

1939 births
Living people
Iranian pianists
Iranian songwriters
People from Rasht
20th-century pianists
20th-century composers
21st-century pianists
21st-century composers